Edgar Eugene Summerlin (September 1, 1928 – October 10, 2006) was an American jazz saxophonist, composer, and educator known for pioneering Liturgical jazz, avant-garde jazz, and free jazz.

Professional career

While a graduate student at the University of North Texas College of Music, Summerlin, in 1959, composed Requiem for Mary Jo, which is widely believed to be one of the first significant uses of jazz in a liturgical service.  He and his wife, Mary Elizabeth (nee Bouknight), had a daughter, Mary Jo (b. April 2, 1958, Denton), who died of heart disease at age nine months on January 27, 1959, in Denton.

He performed Requiem for Mary Jo May 20, 1959, during a service in the chapel at the Perkins School of Theology, Southern Methodist University. Bill Slack, Jr., Assistant Pastor of the First Methodist Church of Denton, who had visited the Summerlins while Mary Jo was near death in the hospital, had encouraged Summerlin to compose Requiem. Dr. Roger Ellwood Ortmayer (1916–1984), then of the Perkins School, commissioned the work.

That same year, still studying and teaching at North Texas, Summerlin recorded his debut LP, Liturgical Jazz, on which "Requiem for Mary Jo," was the heartbreaking centerpiece.

Saturday night, February 13, 1960, NBC's World Wide 60 (hosted by Chet Huntley) visited Denton to air the story of Ed Summerlin's liturgical jazz (national broadcast, NBC, Friday, February 19, 1960).

Summerlin's grieving and spiritual creativity inspired him to compose other liturgical jazz pieces, including

 Episcopal Evensong
 Jazz Vespers Service
 Liturgy of the Holy Spirit Summerlin Music Co. (1965), piano-vocal score, 13 pgs

As the sixties progressed, Summerlin gradually established himself as an avant-garde tenor saxophonist, composer and arranger.

At the same time, his well-publicized prime time television debut was followed by several Sunday morning appearances throughout the 1960s on the long-running CBS series, Look Up and Live, collaborating with musicians such as Freddie Hubbard, Eric Dolphy, Don Ellis, Slide Hampton, and Ron Carter,  as well as choreographer Anna Sokolow. During this decade, Summerlin also scored two feature films, the little-known 1963 Bay of Pigs-inspired drama, We Shall Return (which, coincidentally, featured the first and only original screenplay by oft-adapted novelist Pat Frank) and the even lesser known 1967 film Ciao (written and directed by the earlier film's editor, David Tucker), which, after becoming the only U.S. feature film to be entered in that year's Venice Film Festival, failed to find a distributor and quickly disappeared from view.

Education
Summerlin received a Bachelor of Music in Education, with a Major in Music, Central Missouri State University in 1951, and a Master of Music from the Eastman School of Music the following year. In 1958, after learning about the University of North Texas College of Music while performing with the Johnny Long Band, Summerlin enrolled as a graduate student and became a member of Lab Band and also assisted Gene Hall in teaching jazz composition, theory, and saxophone.

New York
Summerlin relocated to New York in the early 1960s, where he freelanced with Eric Dolphy, Pete LaRoca, Don Ellis, and Sheila Jordan. He also composed and arranged for Ron Carter, Kuhn, Freddie Hubbard, Dave Liebman, Toshiko Akiyoshi, and Lee Konitz.  In 1969 collaborated with saxophonist and journalist Don Heckman to co-lead the Improvisational Jazz Workshop.

 1971 to 1989 — Summerlin founded and directed the jazz program at City College of New York.
 Oct 10, 2006 — Summerlin died in Rhinebeck, NY after a long battle with cancer.

Family
 Former wife (married August 27, 1948 and Oct 15, 1949) — Summerlin married Virginia Lee Allen, in Lexington, MO.
 Former wife, Mary Elizabeth (nee, Bouknight) Hyde Park, NY
 Surviving wife, Karen Jones Summerlin (married December 15, 1974, New York City), currently resides in Staatsburg, New York

son — Jeff Summerlin, Dutchess County, NY
son — Sean Wright, De Soto, KS

Selected discography

As leader
 Liturgical Jazz (Ecclesia Records) (1959)
 The Don Heckman-Ed Summerlin Improvisational Jazz Workshop (Ictus, 1967), co-led with Don Heckman, featuring Steve Kuhn and Ron Carter
 Ring Out Joy (Avant-Garde Records) (1968)
 Still At It (Ictus 1994)
 Recorded at Make Believe Ballroom in West Shokan, New York, Ed Summerlin - Bob Norden Quartet, December 27 & 28, 1993, released 1998
 Ed Summerlin (tenor sax), Bob Norden (trombone), Charlie Kniceley (bass), Chris Starpoli (percussion)
 Sum of the Parts (Ictus, 1998)
 Recorded at Make Believe Ballroom in West Shokan, New York, released February, 1998
 Ed Summerlin (tenor sax), Bruce Ahrens (trumpet), Joe Chambers (drums), Ron Finck (alto sax), Tony Marino (bass)
 Eye on the Future (Ictus, 1999)
 Recorded at Make Believe Ballroom in West Shokan, New York, December 14 & 15, 1998; released 1999
 Ed Summerlin (tenor sax), Bruce Ahrens (trumpet), Bob Norden (trombone), Ron Finck (alto sax), Tony Marino (bass), Adam Nussbaum (drums)

As arranger / composer
With Freddie Hubbard
Hub Cap (Blue Note, 1961)
With Steve Kuhn and Toshiko Akiyoshi
The Country and Western Sound of Jazz Pianos (Dauntless, 1963)
With Caedmon Records
 Winnie the Pooh: Told and Sung (Caedmon, TC 1408; 1972) – words and music by A. A. Milne, Fraser-Simson and Julian Slade, read and sung by Carol Channing; additional music, arrangements and conducting by Ed Summerlin.
 Many Moons (Caedmon, TC-1410; 1972) – James Thurber story read by Peter Ustinov; background music composed and conducted by Edgar Summerlin.
 The Great Quillow (Caedmon, TC 1411; 1972) – James Thurber story read by Peter Ustinov; background music composed and conducted by Ed Summerlin.
 Curious George,' and other stories about Curious George (Caedmon, TC 1420; 1973) – read by Julie Harris; background music composed and conducted by Ed Summerlin.
 '''Curious George Reads the Alphabet,' and other stories about Curious George (Caedmon, TC 1421; 1973) – read by Julie Harris; music composed and conducted by Ed Summerlin.
Whoever heard of a Fird? (Caedmon, TC 1735; 1984) – Othello Bach story performed by Joel Grey; arranged and conducted by Ed Summerlin.With The Rock Generation'Saturday in the Park and Other Songs Made Famous by Chicago (RCA Camden, 1973)"Saturday in the park and other songs made famous by Chicago. Sound recordings: RCA Records". Copyright Encyclopedia. Retrieved 2013-05-17.

 As sideman or combo member 

 The Contemporary Jazz Ensemble: New Sounds From Rochester, Prestige Records (PRLP 163) (1953) 
 Bob Norden (trombone), Bob Silberstein (alto sax), Ed Summerlin (tenor sax), Jim Straney (piano), Neil Courtney (bass), Bill Porter (drums)
 Recorded in Rochester, New York, June 1953
 All the Things You Are Fantasia and Fugue on Poinciana Prelude : Go Forth Prelude and Jazz VariationSee also
 One O'Clock Lab Band, Notable Alumni
 List of American composers
 List of City College of New York people
 List of jazz arrangers
 List of jazz saxophonists
 List of music arrangers
 List of saxophonists
 List of University of North Texas College of Music alumni

References

Further reading
Associated Press: "Group Puts On Show in Texas Church". The Ocala Star-Banner. August 4, 1959.
United Press International. "Prayer Service Set to Jazz Gets World Premiere". The Milwaukee Journal. August 26, 1959. p. 14.
"A Requiem for Mary Jo: Grieving Father Composes Jazz Liturgy as Memorial". The Dubuque Telegraph-Herald. February 17, 1960. TV Guide, p. 2
Dunn, Kristine. "TV to Play Church Jazz". The Miami News. February 19, 1960. p. 8B
Kelsey, Marianne. "Jazz in the Church?". The St. Petersburg Times. February 27, 1960. pp. 1D and 12D.
Vandenberg, Jack (UPI). "Jazz Liturgical Service Ready: It Will Be Performed in Washington Church". The St. Petersburg Times. May 26, 1962. p. 9-D.
Whitney, Elizabeth. "It's a Worship Service in Jazz". The St. Petersburg Times. May 30, 1964. pp. 1C and 3C.
"Jazz Artist Slated for Church Concert". The Newburgh Evening News. April 15, 1966. p. 8B.
Selveggio, Stephen. "Reviewer Says Jazz Oratory Proved Exciting Experience". The Newburgh News. April 18, 1966. p. 2
"Religious Music Workshop Opens". The Pittsburgh Post-Gazette. April 11, 1970. p. 7.
Davis, John. "Snapshot: Summerlin Still Takes Jazz to the Edge". The Millbrook Round Table. July 22, 1993.
Feather, Leonard; Gitler, Ira. "Summerlin, Ed". The Biographical Encyclopedia of Jazz''. New York: Oxford University Press. 1999.

External links

20th-century American composers
20th-century American saxophonists
Free jazz composers
American jazz tenor saxophonists
American male saxophonists
Avant-garde jazz saxophonists
Jazz tenor saxophonists
Free jazz saxophonists
Eastman School of Music alumni
University of North Texas College of Music alumni
American jazz educators
City College of New York faculty
1928 births
2006 deaths
People from Marianna, Florida
American male jazz composers
American jazz composers
20th-century American male musicians
20th-century jazz composers